The polypide in bryozoans encompasses most of the organs and tissues of each individual zooid. This includes the tentacles, tentacle sheath, U-shaped digestive tract, musculature and nerve cells. It is housed in the zooidal exoskeleton, which in cyclostomes is tubular and in cheilostomes is box-shaped.

See also
Bryozoan Anatomy

References 

Bryozoology
Protostome anatomy